Lahmuse is a village in Põhja-Sakala Parish, Viljandi County, Estonia.

Lahmuse manor
Lahmuse estate dates from at least 1593, when it belonged to the Trojanowski family. It subsequently belonged to different local aristocrats until the land reform following Estonia's declaration of independence in 1919. The main building today houses the village school, while the preserved outbuildings are private property.

The main building dates from 1837-1838 and displays a style of neoclassicism that is typical for manor houses in the area from about the same time.

See also
 List of palaces and manor houses in Estonia

References

Villages in Viljandi County
Kreis Fellin